East Central may refer to:

 EC postcode area ("East Central"), which serves most of the City of London
 East Central College, Union, Missouri
 East Central University, Ada, Oklahoma
 East Central Community School District in Miles and Sabula, Iowa

See also
 East Central High School (disambiguation)